Bee orchid is a common name for several orchids and may refer to:

Cottonia peduncularis, a species of orchid from India and Sri Lanka
Diuris carinata, a species of orchid from the south-west of Western Australia
Ida barringtoniae, a species of orchid found in Puerto Rico
Ophrys, a European genus of terrestrial orchids
Ophrys apifera, a species in the genus Ophrys, and the species from which the genus was given its English name